What Men Call Treasure: The Search for Gold at Victorio Peak is a 2008 non-fiction book by Robert Boswell and David Schweidel chronicling the search for gold treasure inside Victorio Peak, New Mexico.

References

2008 non-fiction books
History of New Mexico
Cinco Puntos Press books